The Alaska Packer's Association Diamond NN Cannery located at the mouth of the Naknek River (Bristol Bay) in Naknek, Alaska operated between 1890 and 2015.  In 2020, the cannery site was formally nominated for inclusion on the National Register of Historic Places and in 2021 the nomination was forwarded by the Alaska Historical Commission for national listing consideration. It was listed in August 2021.

An exhibit based on the history of the cannery called, "Mug Up: The Language of Work" opens at the Alaska State Museum in Juneau, AK in February 2022. For cannery workers, "Mug Up," meant a coffee break.

References 

Canneries
Buildings and structures in Bristol Bay Borough, Alaska
2015 disestablishments in Alaska